Jim Harris (born 1955) is an illustrator and author of children’s books, with more than three million copies in print.  His books are best known for their detailed and humorous depictions of animal and human characters.

Bibliography

Author
Jack and the Giant
The Three Little Dinosaurs (and the Big Bad Tyrannosaurus Rex)
Dinosaur's Night Before Christmas

Illustrator 
A Tree in Sprocket’s Pocket
A Very Hairy Christmas
Goose and the Mountain Lion
Gruesome Stew
Jacques and de Beanstalk
Librarian’s Night Before Christmas
Mystery in Bugtown (author: William Boniface)
Petite Rouge
Rapunzel
Slim and Miss Prim (author: Robert Kinerk)
Ten Little Dinosaurs (author: Pattie Schnetzler)
Ten Little Kittens
Ten Little Puppies
The Bible ABC
The Lizard Who Followed Me Home
The Three Little Javelinas
The Three Little Pigs
The Tortoise and the Jackrabbit
The Treasure Hunter
The Trouble With Cauliflower
The Legend of the Whistle Pig Wrangler
The Three Little Cajun Pigs
Towns Down Underground
Tuesday in Arizona
When You're A Pirate Dog and Other Pirate Poems
Wiggler’s Worms

Awards and best seller lists 

Publishers Weekly Top 10 Bestseller List 1997, for Ten Little Dinosaurs
Colorado Book Awards 1997, for Ten Little Dinosaurs
Colorado Children’s Book Award 1998, for Ten Little Dinosaurs
Colorado Children's Book Award Nominee 2001, for Slim and Miss Prim
Children’s Choice Award 1998, for Ten Little Dinosaurs
Arizona Young Readers Award 1994, for The Three Little Javelinas
PBS Reading Rainbow 1994, for The Three Little Javelinas
Colorado Book Award 1994, for Goose and the Mountain Lion
Arizona Young Reader’s Award Finalist, for Goose and the Mountain Lion
Colorado Book Award Finalist, for Rapunzel
Washington Children's Choice Picture Book Award Finalist 1996, for The Three Little Javelinas
Western Writers of America Spur Award 1999, for Slim and Miss Prim
Western Writers of America Storyteller Award Finalist 1998, for Jack and the Giant
New York Society of Illustrators Awards of Merit  1986, 1987, 1990, 1991
New York Society of Illustrators Silver Medal 1991
Communication Arts Award of Excellence 1987
Storytelling World Honor Book 2002, for Petite Rouge
Book Sense 76 Top 10 Pick 2001, for Petite Rouge
National Society for Social Studies/Children’s Book Council Notable Children’s Book 2002, for Petite Rouge
Louisiana Young Reader’s Choice Award 2004, for Petite Rouge
Mockingbird Books 2006, for The Trouble with Cauliflower
OneBookAZ 2010, for The Three Little Javelinas/Los Tres Pequenos Jabalies

Notes

External links 

Biography

1955 births
Living people
American illustrators
20th-century illustrators of fairy tales
21st-century illustrators of fairy tales